Vajira Silva (born 5 December 1966) is a Sri Lankan former first-class cricketer who played for Kandy Cricket Club.

References

External links
 

1966 births
Living people
Sri Lankan cricketers
Kandy Cricket Club cricketers
Cricketers from Colombo